Haddadiyeh (also Romanized as Ḩaddādīyeh, Haddādīyeh, and Haddādīyyeh) is a village in Rudbar-e Qasran Rural District, Rudbar-e Qasran District, Shemiranat County, Tehran Province, Iran. At the 2006 census, its population was 15, in 6 families.

References 

Populated places in Shemiranat County